The Loves of Käthe Keller (German: Die Liebschaften der Kaethe Keller) is a 1919 German silent drama film directed by Carl Froelich and starring Irmgard Bern, Paul Hartmann and Reinhold Schünzel.

The film's sets were designed by the art director Hans Sohnle.

Cast
 Irmgard Bern as Käthe Keller 
 Paul Hartmann as Franz Petrow 
 Reinhold Schünzel as Erbprinz Ottokar 
 Adolf Klein as Forstmeister Petrow, 
 Margarete Kupfer as Frau Keller, Kätes Mutter
 Leopold von Ledebur as Fürst Isensee 
 Paul Kaufmann 
 Oskar Marion
 Margarete Schön

References

Rasul Hasanov  born in Azerbaijan Baku September 14/1984.

External links

1919 films
Films of the Weimar Republic
German silent feature films
Films directed by Carl Froelich
German drama films
1919 drama films
German black-and-white films
Films based on German novels
Silent drama films
1910s German films